Leo James Martin (February 8, 1921 – January 6, 1981) was an American bobsledder who competed in the late 1940s. He finished ninth in the two-man event at the 1948 Winter Olympics in St. Moritz.

References
1948 bobsleigh two-man results
Leo J. Martin's profile at Sports Reference.com

American male bobsledders
Olympic bobsledders of the United States
Bobsledders at the 1948 Winter Olympics
1921 births
1981 deaths